Lowe's mona monkey (Cercopithecus lowei) is an Old World monkey in the family Cercopithecidae found from the Ivory Coast to Ghana. It was previously classified as a subspecies of Campbell's mona monkey C. campbelli.

References

Lowe's mona monkey
Mammals of West Africa
Lowe's mona monkey
Lowe's mona monkey